Shiwa Ng'andu is a constituency of the National Assembly of Zambia. It covers the towns of Bulaya, Chibesakunda, Chibwa, Chitembo, Chitumbwe, Matumbo and Mutita in Shiwang'andu District of Muchinga Province, as well as the Shiwa Ngandu estate.

List of MPs

References

Constituencies of the National Assembly of Zambia
1973 establishments in Zambia
Constituencies established in 1973